Oxford Cave is a cave in Manchester Parish in west-central Jamaica. It is 765 metres long and at 290 metres altitude. The cave entrance is close by a main road and because of its accessibility has suffered much graffiti, vandalism and litter. It is a roost for a great many bats, but these are under threat from the number of anti-social human visitors, many there to collect bat guano to use as farm fertiliser, others for bashments.

See also
 List of caves in Jamaica
Jamaican Caves Organisation
Manchester Parish, Jamaica

External links
Map.
Aerial view.
Photo.
Oxford Cave Field Notes.

References

Caves of the Caribbean
Bat roosts
Caves of Jamaica
Geography of Manchester Parish